Čortanovci is a village located in the Inđija municipality, Srem District, Vojvodina province, Serbia. It As of 2011 census results, the village has a population of 2,337 inhabitants.

Because of its pleasant climate and neighboring Danube, it is mostly visited by citizens who have houses in that village. They usually spend their summer holidays there or at weekends. The Serbian Orthodox Church of St. Nicholas is located in the village.

Name
The name of the village in Serbian is plural.

Demographics

As of 2011 census, the village of Čortanovci has a population of 2,337 inhabitants.

See also
 List of places in Serbia
 List of cities, towns and villages in Vojvodina

References

 Slobodan Ćurčić, Broj stanovnika Vojvodine, Novi Sad, 1996.

External links

Populated places in Syrmia